Penhill ( high at the trig point,  at Height of Hazely) is a prominent hill,  south west of Leyburn, in the Pennines, North Yorkshire, England. It forms a ridge that commands the southern side of Wensleydale and the northern side of Coverdale.  Its concave shape was formed during the last ice age, when glaciers carved Wensleydale into a U-shape. The summit plateau has a trig point, small tarns on the peat moor, and, visible from the valley floor, a beacon at its eastern end, part of the large network built to warn of a Spanish invasion.

Penhill is accessed by public footpaths from the village of West Witton, by a bridleway from a minor road between West Witton and Melmerby, or over open access land from the south.

Although Penhill is not a very high hill, its position near the mouth of Wensleydale makes it visible from a considerable distance - from the North York Moors across the Vale of York, as well as from many points in the dale.

Like Pendle Hill, Penhill is a pleonastic name consisting of Brittonic (penn) and Old English (hyll) words for "hill". One local legend is that the hill was the home of the Penhill Giant, who would steal sheep from the local flocks.

References

External links

Peaks of the Yorkshire Dales
Wensleydale